EPPTB (RO-5212773) is a drug developed by Hoffmann-La Roche which acts as a potent and selective inverse agonist of trace amine-associated receptor 1 (TAAR1), with no significant activity at other targets. EPPTB is one of the first selective antagonists developed for TAAR1, and has been used to demonstrate an important role for TAAR1 in regulation of dopaminergic signalling in the limbic system. Although EPPTB has high affinity for the mouse TAAR1, it has much lower affinity for rat and human TAAR1, which limits its use in research. While the human and mouse forms of TAAR1 have similar functions and bind similar ligands, the actual binding affinities of individual ligands often vary significantly between the two versions of the receptor.

See also 
 RO5166017

References 

Receptor antagonists